The Silberplatten is a mountain of the Appenzell Alps (Alpstein massif), overlooking the Schwägalp Pass in the canton of St. Gallen. Its  summit is located near the Grenzchopf, where runs the border with the canton of Appenzell Ausserrhoden.

References

External links
 Silberplatten on Hikr
 Spherical panorama of Silberplatten

Mountains of Switzerland
Mountains of the Alps
Mountains of the canton of St. Gallen
Appenzell Alps